Hossein Abad Metro Station is a metro train station in line 3 of the Tehran Metro. It is located on Mozhdeh Street at Hossein Abad neighbourhood in Northwestern Tehran.

This station is the 106th station of Tehran Metro with a unique architectural design constructed in 10,000 m2 of land area for which more than 85000 m3 of excavation, 25000 m2 of formwork, 35000 m3 of concrete and 4000 tons of reinforcement have been done. 16 escalators have been installed to carry passengers to various levels.

On 12 December 2016 with the speeches delivered by Tehran Mayor and CEO of Tehran Urban & Suburban Railway Co. and at presence of senior managers of Boland Payeh Co., Hossein Abad Metro Station is officially opened to public.

Boland Payeh Co. is the design and build contractor for construction of this station. The company has completed major parts of Line 3 of Tehran Metro, which connects south-west of Tehran to its north-east.

References

Tehran Metro stations
Railway stations opened in 2016
2016 establishments in Iran